Rein Saluri (born on 22 September 1939) is an Estonian writer and playwright.

Saluri was born in the Tammiku, Salla Parish (now part of Väike-Maarja Parish). In 1946, when he was seven, Saluri, along with his family, were deported to Tobolsk by Soviet authorities. They were later permitted to return to Estonian in 1951. Saluri graduated from Tartu State University with a degree in biology in 1964.1962–1989, he was a member of Communist Party of the Soviet Union.  

He has worked as an editor for editors of the popular science magazine Horisont, the youth journal Noorus, the literary magazine Looming and as the literary editor for the Estonian Drama Theatre in Tallinn from 1972 until 1975. He has been a member of the Estonian Writers' Union since 1974.

He has written psychological short stories and plays, as well as children's literature.

Awards:
 Friedebert Tuglas short story award (1973)
 Juhan Smuul literary award (1977)
 Friedebert Tuglas Short Story Award (1981)
 Juhan Smuul literary award(1983)
 Honored Writer of the Estonian SSR
 Friedebert Tuglas Short Story Award (1988)
 Juhan Smuul Annual Literature Prize (1989)
 Order of the White Star, V Class (2001)

Selected works
 shorty story "Mälu" (1972)
 play "Külalised" (1974)
 shorty story "Kõnelused" (1976)
 shorty story "Rebane räästa all" (1979)
 shorty story "Üks, kaks ja korraga" (1983)
 shorty story "Puusõda" (1985)
 shorty story "Vaikne elu" (1988)
 play "Minek" (1989)

References

Living people
1939 births
Estonian male short story writers
Estonian children's writers
Estonian dramatists and playwrights
20th-century Estonian writers
21st-century Estonian writers
Recipients of the Order of the White Star, 5th Class
University of Tartu alumni
People from Väike-Maarja Parish